The 1911 Philadelphia Phillies season was a season in Major League Baseball. The Phillies finished fourth in the National League with a record of 79 wins and 73 losses.

Offseason

City Series 
Phillies Hall of Fame pitcher Grover Cleveland Alexander made his Philadelphia debut during the pre-season City Series against the Philadelphia Athletics. Alexander pitched five innings of no-hit no-run baseball against the A's. He would make his official major league debut on April 15, 1911.

Notable transactions 
 November 12, 1910: Johnny Bates, Eddie Grant, George McQuillan and Lew Moren were traded by the Phillies to the Cincinnati Reds for Jack Rowan, Fred Beebe, Hans Lobert and Dode Paskert.

Regular season

Season standings

Record vs. opponents

Notable transactions 
 August 18, 1911: Jack Rowan was traded by the Phillies to the Chicago Cubs for Cliff Curtis.
 September 11, 1911: Red Kleinow was released by the Phillies.

Roster

Player stats

Batting

Starters by position 
Note: Pos = Position; G = Games played; AB = At bats; H = Hits; Avg. = Batting average; HR = Home runs; RBI = Runs batted in

Other batters 
Note: G = Games played; AB = At bats; H = Hits; Avg. = Batting average; HR = Home runs; RBI = Runs batted in

Pitching

Starting pitchers 
Note: G = Games pitched; IP = Innings pitched; W = Wins; L = Losses; ERA = Earned run average; SO = Strikeouts

Other pitchers 
Note: G = Games pitched; IP = Innings pitched; W = Wins; L = Losses; ERA = Earned run average; SO = Strikeouts

Relief pitchers 
Note: G = Games pitched; W = Wins; L = Losses; SV = Saves; ERA = Earned run average; SO = Strikeouts

Notes

References 

1911 Philadelphia Phillies season at Baseball Reference

Philadelphia Phillies seasons
Philadelphia Phillies season
Philadelphia Phillies